Dunsinane may refer to:

Dunsinane (play), a 2010 play by David Greig
Dunsinane Curling Club, a curling club in Perthshire, Scotland
Dunsinane Hill, remains of two forts, mentioned in Shakespeare's Macbeth, near Collace, Perthshire, Scotland
Dunsinane Mountain, officially known as "Dunsinane", a summit in Colorado, U.S.
William Nairne, Lord Dunsinane, Scottish advocate and judge